Benon Magezi (1960 – 15 June 2021) was an Anglican bishop in Uganda.

Biography

He was Bishop of North Kigezi since 2017 until his death.

Magezi was born in 1960 in Bwanda village, Rukungiri District and died on 15 June 2021 at the Mulago National Specialised Hospital at the age of 60, from the consequences of an infection with COVID-19.

References

1960 births
2021 deaths
21st-century Anglican bishops in Uganda
Anglican bishops of North Kigezi
Deaths from the COVID-19 pandemic in Uganda
People from Rukungiri District